Lee Jong-won (born December 31, 1994) is a South Korean actor and model. He is known for his roles in dramas such as My Unfamiliar Family, XX, and The Spies Who Loved Me.

Personal life 
Lee served in the military since 2015 at the Republic of Korea Army Mark Army 30th Mechanized Infantry Division, a military service before making his debut as an actor and model.

Filmography

Film

Television series

Web series

Music video

Awards and nominations

References

External links
 
 

1994 births
Living people
South Korean male models
21st-century South Korean male actors
South Korean male film actors
South Korean male television actors
South Korean male web series actors